Carlotta Louise Harshbarger Emery DeLong (January 19, 1939 – October 11, 2005) was an American writer and encyclopedist.

Biography
Emery was born in Los Angeles where her parents had gone in search of employment after being displaced from their home in Washington state by a crop failure.  Emery grew up as a rancher's daughter in Montana after her parents moved there during her infancy (her father, Carl Harshbarger, had worked as chauffeur for Dorothy Lamour in Los Angeles for about two years, and had saved enough funds to buy some land there).  Emery was a proponent of organic farming, the "back-to-the-land movement", and author of the Encyclopedia of Country Living. Emery opened the "School of Country Living" in Kendrick, Idaho in 1976, with her husband Mike Emery, to teach homesteading skills. The "School" was destroyed by a flash flood the next year, and could not successfully be reestablished. Mike and Carla divorced in 1985. Carla married constitutionalist legal scholar (with a special interest in Title 18, Oath of Office) Donald DeLong November 25, 2000 and moved to San Simon, Arizona.

Carla self-published the first mimeographed edition of the Encyclopedia under the title An Old-Fashioned Recipe Book.  Although she began intending to write a book, she published it in installments starting in 1970 as she wrote it, as if it were a newsletter.  The first complete book was finished in March 1974.  By the end of 1975, she had sold 13,000 copies.  Around that time the book was listed in the Guinness Book of Records as the "largest mimeographed volume in general circulation" (700 pages) and was listed as having sold the most copies of a self-published guide: 45,000 mimeographed copies as of 1977.  The author believed that it might set a record for the most typographical errors in a book of its size, but reported that she did not have time to count them.

In the mid-1970s Emery made several television appearances, including on "The Mike Douglas Show", Johnny Carson's "Tonight Show" and "Good Morning, America", and even demonstrated goat-milking on "Donahue".

Emery's book did not find a commercial publisher until the 7th edition when it was published by Bantam in 1977.  The most recent edition of the Encyclopedia, the "updated 10th edition," was published by Sasquatch Books in 2008.. A new "40th Anniversary Edition" was made available October 31, 2012, published by Sasquatch Books.

The Encyclopedia of Country Living presents an exhaustive overview of virtually every topic relevant to homesteading and self-sufficiency.

During the 1990s, Emery researched somnambulism, hypnosis, and mind control. Because of a personal history as a victim of hypnotism abuse, she wrote a second book,  Secret, Don't Tell: The Encyclopedia of Hypnotism. By writing this, she hoped to help others who found themselves with the same distressful fate. It was difficult to find a publisher because the publishers feared possible repercussions from government entities. Don and Carla self-published this book in 1998, under Acorn Hill Publishing.. The book criticized hypnosis in general, and what the author considered to be its unethical uses. Her widower, Don DeLong, now holds the copyrights to this book.

Part I of Secret, Don't Tell contains four major case histories of criminal hypnosis which have been researched either by psychiatrists or investigative journalists.  Each of those case histories is a clear-cut, well-studied, detailed case of hypnotic abuse - deceitful, amnesic, chronic, and damaging.  Scattered throughout the book, many other significant cases involving criminal mind control are also described.

On October 11, 2005, while on a speaking tour, Emery died in Odessa, Texas from complications of pneumonia. She was surrounded by all of her family.

See also
Back-to-the-land movement
Organic agriculture
Self-sufficiency
Interactionism
Mind control
Somniloquy
Posthypnotic amnesia
History of hypnosis
Project MKUltra

Sources
Secret, Don't Tell website
Carla Emery website
Mother Earth News, "School of Country Living Lives," Issue # 35 - September/October 1976
Mother Earth News, "The Plowboy Interview: Carla Emery," Issue No. 33 - May/June 1975
Mother Earth News, "Newsworthies," Issue # 43 - January/February 1977
Carla Emery DeLong Modern Homesteading Movement Newsletter, "History of Editions of Carla's Book," 02-14-05
10th edition of the Encyclopedia
50th Anniversary Edition of the Encyclopedia
Encyclopedia of Country Living Blog maintained by publishing company

1939 births
2005 deaths
Roosevelt University alumni
American encyclopedists
American food writers
People from Latah County, Idaho
Women encyclopedists
Women food writers